The A. S. Bradford House, also known as The Bradford House, is a historic home in Placentia, California.  It was the home of Albert Sumner Bradford, who founded Placentia by arranging for establishment of a water tank along the railway.  Homes and businesses within a one-mile radius could get water.

Designed by James Stafford, the Colonial Revival, 15-room house was built in 1902, in an orange grove.

It was listed on the National Register of Historic Places in 1978, and operated as a house museum at one point.

Albert Sumner Bradford (August 18, 1860—March 30, 1933), originally from Shapleigh, Maine, bought 20 acres land in 1890 in what would become  his Tesoro Ranch Placentia.  He did much to support growth of the citrus industry.

See also
National Register of Historic Places listings in Orange County, California
List of Ranchos of California

References

External links

Houses in Orange County, California
Historic house museums in California
Museums in Orange County, California
Placentia, California
Houses completed in 1902
Houses on the National Register of Historic Places in California
National Register of Historic Places in Orange County, California
Colonial Revival architecture in California